Pawtuxet is the name of a river in Rhode Island, United States. A number of things have been named after the river.

Places

 Pawtuxet River, a river in Rhode Island, USA 
 Cranston, Rhode Island, a city originally named Pawtuxet 
 Pawtuxet Village, a village in the city of Cranston

Ships

 , a gunboat built during the American Civil War 
 , a revenue cutter built during the American Civil War 
 , a class of revenue cutters built during the American Civil War

Other

 Rhodes-on-the Pawtuxet, an historic building in Cranston, Rhode Island 
 Pawtuxet Valley Dyeing Company, a manufacturing facility in Coventry, Rhode Island